Pierre Bardy (born 4 September 1987, Monaco) is a Monegasque politician. Since 2018, he is a member of the National Council of Monaco. He is a Director of Cometh-Somoclim's Maintenance Department.

Life 
Pierre Bardy was born on 4 September 1987 in Monaco. He graduated with a master's degree in International Trade from Kedge Business School in Bordeaux, France.

From 2010 until 2018, Bardy worked as market analyst at different branches of ENGIE in Paris, London, Zurich, and Monaco. He is a Director of Cometh-Somoclim's Maintenance Department.

He is married and has 7 children with his wife Helena.

Political career 
In 2018, Bardy was elected as a member of the National Council of Monaco on the list of the political group Primo! (Priority Monaco). Bardy is a member of the association “Energy Assistance Monaco”. In 2019, Bardy awarded the Conseil National Award at the Graduation of the International School of Monaco students.

References 

Living people
1987 births
Priorité Monaco politicians
Members of the National Council (Monaco)